The Hotel Riu Plaza España is a historic skyscraper, the 8th tallest building in Madrid, Spain. It opened in 1953 as the Edificio España, a mixed-use structure containing a hotel, offices, apartments and shops. It is an example of 20th-century Spanish architecture built in the neo-baroque style. The Spanish RIU Hotels chain acquired the building in 2017 and reopened it as a hotel in 2019.

History

It was designed by architect Julián Otamendi and his brother in the Neo-baroque style and constructed from 1948 and was completed in 1953. It was a "symbol of prosperity" during the decades of Francisco Franco's Spain.

The building formerly housed the 360-room Hotel Plaza (later the Crowne Plaza Madrid City Centre), 300 offices, 184 apartments, a shopping centre, and a rooftop pool. Its profile, on Plaza de España at the end of the Gran Vía, complements the neighboring skyscraper Torre de Madrid, making the pair important architectural landmarks in the city.

Metrovacesa, which owned the structure since its completion, marketed it in April 2005 along with the neighboring Torre de Madrid to help finance its acquisition of French property company, Gecina.

In June 2005, Santander Real's investment fund acquired 50% of the building for €138.6 million, committing to purchase the remaining 50% belonging to the hotel shortly thereafter. The Crowne Plaza Hotel occupying the building closed in 2006. The deal closed in early December 2007. Santander renovated the building, preserving intact the facade and the lobby as part of a project to build a hotel and apartments, but the project stalled in 2010.

The building was acquired in 2014 by Wang Jianlin's Chinese real estate company Dalian Wanda for "about a third less than the €389 million that Banco Santander paid in 2005, at the height of Spain’s construction boom". Dalian Wanda "plans to renovate the structure to include luxury apartments and a hotel as part of a broader overhaul of the neighborhood", and in January 2015 the Governing Board of the Community of Madrid approved the proposed refurbishment. Wang intends to "create a luxury hotel, more than 300 homes and a retail space, which he plans to expand to 15,000 sqm".

By the time it was purchased by Dalian Wanda, it had been empty for several years and "had become a symbol of the Spanish real estate market’s collapse in 2008" that marked the beginning of the Great Recession in Spain. Wanda later sold the structure to the Baraka Group.

In January 2017, it was announced that the building will be remodeled into a Riu Plaza hotel. In June 2017, RIU Hotels bought the entire structure outright from the Baraka Group. They remodeled the building to serve entirely as a hotel, the Hotel Riu Plaza España, which opened on 13 August 2019. The lower three floors contain retail, while the rest of the building houses a 585-room hotel with 5,000m² of event space, two restaurants, and a rooftop pool and skybar distributed over the two upper levels, 26 (covered) and 27, with 500 square meters of wide terrace.

Since April 2022, the Edificio España houses the Zara flagship store in Spain. The new Zara together with Stradivarius add up to a total of 9,000 square meters of surface area. It is presumably the company's largest store in the world to date.

In popular culture 

The building is depicted in 1984 movie The Hit. A part of it is shot in an apartment in the nearby Torre de Madrid, from which the Edifico España is well visible.

In 2007 documentary filmmaker Víctor Moreno began "filming over 200 workers, mostly immigrants from all over the world, hired to demolish the interior" of the building with the approval of the building's then owner, Banco Santander. However, the bank reversed its position without explanation and blocked its release in Spain for 15 months. Despite the ban, the documentary was shown at the San Sebastián International Film Festival, Buenos Aires International Festival of Independent Cinema, and Doclisboa. It was eventually released in the movies in Spain in 2014.

See also
 Telefónica Building
 Torre de Madrid
 Spanish architecture

References

External links 
 
 Hotel Riu Plaza España official website

Buildings and structures in Universidad neighborhood, Madrid
Skyscraper office buildings in Madrid